Jenaplan (or Jena Plan) schools are based on a teaching concept conceived and founded by the German pedagogue Peter Petersen from 1923-1927. The term Jenaplan was coined by the London committee for preparing the 4th meeting of the ‘’New Education Fellowship’’  in Locarno in 1927. Petersen developed his concept at the University of Jena (hence the term), where he was the head of the Department of Education since 1923.

The basic ideas are: independent learning by doing, cooperation and communal life, shared responsibility by school children and parents.
The basic forms of education according to the Jenaplan approach are:

 Teaching: (interdisciplinary) core teaching, free work (free choice of discipline), course teaching (in special disciplines)
 Party and celebrations: morning circle, week closure celebrations, birthday parties, enrollment and others
 Discussions: round-tables, reports, talks, clarifying debates etc.
 Play (free play, learning games, pause games, gymnastics games, theatre play): this supports the development of younger children, teaches rules for social behaviour, promotes attention

The Jenaplan schools operate according to 20 basic principles, e.g.:
 Each human being is unique. Therefore, each child and each adult has an irreplaceable value and a special dignity.
 Each human being has the right to develop their own identity, irrespective of ethnic origin, nationality, social environment, religion, philosophy or abilities/disabilities.
 Every person is always recognized in their entirety. They are encountered and treated in this way, wherever possible.
 People should work for a society that respects the irreplaceable value and the dignity of every individual human being.
 People should work for a society that offers the opportunity and incentives for developing the identity of each person.

Schools
Jenaplan schools in Germany are, among others:

 Jenaplan-Schule in Jena
 Kaleidoskop Jena - Jenaplanschule in Jena (district Lobeda) 
 Evangelische Schule St. Marien in Neubrandenburg
 Freie Comenius Schule in Darmstadt
 Freie Schule LernZeitRäume in Dossenheim (near Heidelberg) 
 Jenaplanschule in Rostock
 Jenaplanschule in Hungen
 Jenaplan-Schule in Nürnberg
 Jenaplan-Gymnasium in Nürnberg
 Jenaplan-Schule in Weimar
 Laborschule in Dresden
 Lauterschule in Suhl

Jenaplan schools in the Netherlands are, among a total of 190 Jenaplan schools:
 Jenaplan OSG Sevenwolden in Heerenveen, Friesland
 Peter-Petersenschool in Haren, Groningen 
 O.B.S. De Woldstroom in Meppel, Drenthe 
 JenaXL in Zwolle, Overijssel
 O.J.S. Het Palet in Hardenberg, Overijssel
 Jenaplanschool Pierson in Hengelo, Gelderland
De Zonnewijzer in Heerhugowaard, Noord Holland 
 Jenaplan School De Kring in Oegstgeest, Zuid Holland

Other Jenaplan schools are located in Belgium, Austria, South Tyrol (Italy), and Japan.

References

External links
 Gesellschaft für Jenaplanpädagogik in Deutschland e.V.
 Inventory case study by the OECD
 Jenaplan in South Tyrol

Alternative education
School types
Progressive education
Education in Germany